Evžen Linhart (20 March 1898, Kouřim – 29 December 1949, Prague) otherwise known as Eugen Linhart was a Czech architect and designer of furniture, exponent of Czech functionalism and purism.

he was one from the members of Puristic fourth, he belongs to the representants of the architecture in association of modern Czech avant-garde Devětsil.

See also
association of modern Czech avant-garde Devětsil
List of Czech architects

External links
Own villa in Prague (in Czech)

1898 births
1949 deaths
People from Kolín District
Czech architects
Czech designers